The REMUS (Remote Environmental Monitoring UnitS) series are autonomous underwater vehicles (AUVs) made by the Woods Hole Oceanographic Institution and designed by their Oceanographic Systems Lab (OSL). More recently REMUS vehicles have been manufactured by the spinoff company Hydroid Inc. a wholly owned subsidiary of Kongsberg Maritime. The series are designed to be low cost, they have shared control software and electronic subsystems and can be operated from a laptop computer. They are used by civilians for seafloor mapping, underwater surveying, and search and recovery as well as by several navies for mine countermeasures missions.

Models
There are four variants of the REMUS, all are torpedo-shaped vessels with reconfigurable sensors.

REMUS 6000
It was developed through cooperation between the Naval Oceanographic Office, the Office of Naval Research, and the Woods Hole Oceanographic Institution (WHOI).

In 2018 the Japan Agency for Marine-Earth Science and Technology (JAMSTEC) received an order of New Generation REMUS 6000 AUVs. The New Generation REMUS 6000 is based on the legacy REMUS 6000 platform with "a modular architecture that allows for the addition of multiple payloads including customer sensor packages, forward fins and additional battery sections.” Hydroid also claims that the New Generation model has increased endurance.

REMUS 600
The midsized REMUS 600 was previously known as the REMUS 12.75, so called due to its  diameter. It was renamed to the 600 to correspond to the maximum depth at which it can operate (600m). The US Navy derivative of this platform is designated Mk 18 Mod 2 “Kingfish." The Mk 18 Mod 2 is equipped with side-scan sonar, a downward-looking video camera, ADCP, GPS, beam attenuation meter (BAM) to measure turbidity, and a conductivity temperature depth (CTD) sensor.

REMUS 100 

The REMUS 100 takes its name from its max operating depth of 100 meters. The US Navy operates a derivative of the REMUS 100, in addition to the standard REMUS 100, designated Mk 18 Mod 1 “Swordfish”.

REMUS M3V 
The REMUS M3V (Micro 300 Meter Rated Vehicle) is the smallest in the range and is designed to fit the A-type sonobouy design envelope (91.5 x 12.4 cm). The M3V can travel at 10 knots and dive to 300 meters, apparently uniquely among the REMUS family the M3V can be airdropped.

Operational history
REMUS units were used successfully in 2003 during Operation Iraqi Freedom to detect mines, and in 2011 during the fourth search for the missing aircraft "black boxes" from the crashed Air France flight AF447, which they successfully found. Three REMUS 6000 units were used in the AF447 search. In a video posted by Colombian president Juan Manuel Santos, a REMUS 6000 is seen being used by the Colombian Navy to examine the shipwreck, now patrimony, of galleon San José that sunk in 1708 off the coast of Cartagena de Indias. 

In 2012, the mine detection-variant of the REMUS 600 was deployed by the US Navy to the 5th Fleet, operating primarily in the Persian Gulf. REMUS vehicles in Navy service are generally deployed from  rigid hull inflatable boats, which can carry two vehicles, although they have been deployed from littoral combat ship  and from an MH-60S Seahawk helicopter in exercises. In 2018, a US Navy REMUS 600 named “Smokey” was captured by Houthi combat divers off the coast of Yemen; the Houthi forces published a video of the captured vehicle.

The University of Hawaii at Manoa operates a REMUS 100 equipped to measure salinity, temperature, currents, bathymetry and water quality parameters. These measurements help support research conducted by the university's nearshore/offshore sensor network and water sampling programs.

In 2019 researchers at the University of Exeter used a Woods Hole Oceanographic Institution owned REMUS 100 based SharkCam off the coast of Coll and Tiree to study basking sharks.

Operators

Forces navales algériennes

United States Navy
Woods Hole Oceanographic Institute
Naval Oceanographic Office 
University of Hawaii at Manoa

Royal Navy

Croatian Navy

Finnish Navy

Royal Netherlands Navy

Royal Canadian Navy

Japan Agency for Marine-Earth Science and Technology
Japan Maritime Self-Defense Force 
Remus 100 used as OZZ-1/3.
Remus 600 used as OZZ-2/4 at Awaji-class minesweeper

Irish naval service

Royal New Zealand Navy

See also 
Exercise REP(MUS)

References

External links

 A picture of the types of REMUS units produced

Autonomous underwater vehicles
Oceanography